Shunta (written: , ,  or ) is a masculine Japanese given name. Notable people with the name include:

, Japanese footballer
, Japanese baseball player
, Japanese footballer
, Japanese footballer
, Japanese footballer
, Japanese footballer
, Japanese footballer
, Japanese baseball player
, Japanese footballer
, Japanese baseball player

Japanese masculine given names